Dothidasteroma is a genus of fungi in the family Parmulariaceae.

References

External links
Dothidasteroma at Index Fungorum

Parmulariaceae
Taxa named by Franz Xaver Rudolf von Höhnel